Samuel E. Blackwell (born August 31, 1930) was an American politician in the state of Wyoming. He served in the Wyoming House of Representatives as a member of the Democratic Party. He was an employee at FMC Corporation.

References

1930 births
Living people
People from Sweetwater County, Wyoming
Democratic Party members of the Wyoming House of Representatives